"Like, Long Hair" is a 1961 top-40 hit song by American rock band Paul Revere & the Raiders. An instrumental composed by the group and arranged by Gary Paxton, it spent six weeks on the Billboard Hot 100, peaking at No. 38.

References

1961 songs
1961 singles
Paul Revere & the Raiders songs
Rock instrumentals